Lions Drag Strip was an American raceway in the Wilmington district of Los Angeles, California, adjacent to Long Beach that existed from 1955 to 1972.  The track was named after its sponsors Lions Clubs International and featured many races that were sanctioned by the American Hot Rod Association (AHRA).

As the area surrounding the track increased in population, complaints regarding noise were made to government officials. Subsequently, efforts were made to deny the operators of track continued use of the facility.  The track was opened with a 30 days' notice clause that could be enforced at any time, and on November 2, 1972, that notice was given. After the last races took place on December 2, 1972, the track was torn down through the efforts of the Los Angeles Harbor Department to make space for overseas shipping cargo containers which exists to this day at 223rd Street & Alameda Street in Wilmington, CA.

The track location remained abandoned for over 10 years until it was developed into the mega container facility by the L.A. Harbor Commission. The 1971/72 noise issue was then and is still seen by many local fans as a political ruse to close the track, although this cannot be substantiated. This same scenario has been repeated across the country as residential areas develop around older racing facilities

In popular culture
The television series The Munsters filmed most of the episode "Hot Rod Herman" (aired on May 27, 1965) at Lions Drag Strip.
The track announcer for many races in the late 1960s and early 1970s was broadcast personality and motorsports announcer Larry Huffman, whose frenetic announcing style was later spoofed by countless stand-up comedians.
The television series MadMen mentions the Lions Drag Strip in "The Mountain King" (Season 2, Episode 12).
In Once Upon a Time in Hollywood, Brad Pitt'''s character, Cliff Booth, is seen wearing a Lions Drag Strip t-shirt.
Lions Drag Strip was used in "Who Won" Adam-12 Season 4 Episode 22, premiering March 1, 1972. In the episode, Malloy and Reed work with young hot rodders in an effort to get them off the streets. In a rare acting appearance, Dick Clark portrays Mr. Benson, the track's owner. It's ironic that Adam 12 and LAPD as advisors promoted this series as an effort to curb street racing in March 1972, Then the city of Los Angeles closes down the strip in December of 1972. Oh well back on the street!

ReferencesLast Call for Lions, Los Angeles Herald-Examiner, December 1, 1972.Following "The Last Drag Race": Souvenir hunters attack Lions strip'', Long Beach Independent/Press-Telegram, December 4, 1972.

External links
Lions Automobilia Foundation and Museum
Copy of a Petersen publication from 1973 detailing the history of Lions

Former location Google maps
 https://maps.google.com/maps?q=lions+drag+strip&oe=utf-8&client=firefox-a&ie=UTF8&hl=en&ll=33.828608,-118.225572&spn=0.013297,0.027874&t=h&z=16

Motorsport venues in California
Defunct motorsport venues in the United States
Defunct drag racing venues
History of Los Angeles
Sports venues in Los Angeles
Lions Clubs International
Sports venues completed in 1955
1955 establishments in California
1972 disestablishments in California